Per Berg Lund (14 October 1878 – 22 January 1954) was a Norwegian politician and jurist for the Liberal Party who served Minister of Finance from 1928-1931 and again from 1933-1934. He also served as the director of the Norwegian Tax Administration from 1934 to 1948.

References
 

1878 births
1954 deaths
Ministers of Finance of Norway
Liberal Party (Norway) politicians
Directors of government agencies of Norway